Rose-Aimée Bacoul (born 9 January 1952 in Le François, Martinique) is a French athlete who specialises in the 100 and 200 meters. Bacoul competed in the women's 100 and 200 meters and also the 4 × 100 meter relay at the 1984 Summer Olympics.

References

External links
 sports reference

French female sprinters
Olympic athletes of France
Martiniquais athletes
French people of Martiniquais descent
Living people
Athletes (track and field) at the 1984 Summer Olympics
1952 births
European Athletics Championships medalists
Mediterranean Games gold medalists for France
Athletes (track and field) at the 1983 Mediterranean Games
Mediterranean Games medalists in athletics
Universiade bronze medalists for France
Universiade medalists in athletics (track and field)
Medalists at the 1975 Summer Universiade
Olympic female sprinters